Dong Jinzhi (born 7 March 1977) is a Chinese alpine skier. She competed in two events at the 2006 Winter Olympics.

References

External links
 
 
 
 

1977 births
Living people
Chinese female alpine skiers
Olympic alpine skiers of China
Alpine skiers at the 2006 Winter Olympics
Alpine skiers at the 1999 Asian Winter Games
Alpine skiers at the 2003 Asian Winter Games
Alpine skiers at the 2007 Asian Winter Games
Skiers from Heilongjiang
21st-century Chinese women